The 2020 24H GT Series powered by Hankook was the sixth season of the 24H Series with drivers battling for championship points and titles and the eleventh season since Creventic, the organiser and promoter of the series, organised multiple races a year. The races were contested with GT3-spec cars, GT4-spec cars, sports cars and 24H-Specials, like silhouette cars.

Calendar

NOTE:  The Austin round date was originally scheduled for 13-15 November, but after COVID-19 forced the postponement of the MotoGP round in Austin, that race was rescheduled to the date originally planned for 24H .  Creventic and the circuit will announce a rescheduled date.

Entry List

Race results
Bold indicates overall winner.

Championship standings

Drivers' Overall Continents Series

Teams' Overall Continents Series

GT3-Pro Drivers' Continents Series

GT3-Pro Teams' Continents Series

GT3-AM Drivers' Continents Series

GT3-AM Drivers' Continents Series

GTX Drivers' Continents Series

GTX Teams' Continents Series

991 Drivers' Continents Series

991 Teams' Continents Series

GT4 Drivers' Continents Series

GT4 Teams' Continents Series

Cayman Drivers' Continents Series

Cayman Teams' Continents Series

Drivers' Overall Europe Series

Teams' Overall Europe Series

GT3-Pro Drivers' Europe Series

GT3-Pro Teams' Europe Series

GT3-AM Drivers' Europe Series

GT3-AM Teams' Europe Series

GTX Drivers' Europe Series

GTX Teams' Europe Series

991 Drivers' Europe Series

991 Teams' Europe Series

GT4 Drivers' Europe Series

GT4 Teams' Europe Series

Cayman Drivers' Europe Series

Cayman Teams' Europe Series

See also
24H Series
2020 Dubai 24 Hour

Notes

References

External links

24H GT
24H GT